Terrance Paul Richardson (born May 7, 1953) is a Canadian retired ice hockey goaltender. He played 20 games in the National Hockey League with the Detroit Red Wings and St. Louis Blues between 1973 and 1979. The rest of his career, which lasted from 1973 to 1981, was spent in the minor leagues. Richardson was selected 11th overall by Detroit in the 1973 NHL Amateur Draft.

Career
Richard began his career with the New Westminster Bruins during the 1971–72 season. He recorded three shutouts that year with a 3.06 goals against average (GAA). He had a record of 31–22–5 in 1972–73.

In 1973, Richardson was selected in the first round by the Red Wings. Richardson played in nine games that year finishing with one win and four losses and a dismal 5.33 goals against average. He was sent down to the Virginia Wings of the American Hockey League for conditioning and even was sent to the United Kingdom for a short time to play for the London Lions. The following year he returned to the Wings, but his skill did not. Richardson played only four games for the club and ended with a 6.83 GAA and one win before being sent back down to Virginia. The following season was no better, as the one NHL game that Richarson started ended in a loss with the score of 7–0 going to the Boston Bruins. He spent the rest of that year playing of both the Springfield Indians and the New Haven Nighthawks of the AHL.

The Red Wings decided to give Richardson one last shot with their club as he would start five games in the 1976–77 season, but again would disappoint, ending with one win and three losses. Richardson spent the rest of that year with the Kalamazoo Wings of the International Hockey League, leading them into the playoffs. However Kalamazoo would get knocked out in the second round. In 1977–78, Richardson played for the Kansas City Red Wings of the Central Hockey League, where he played a full season but finished with a 27–32–2 record.

On July 26, 1978, Richardson was signed as free agent by the St. Louis Blues, and found himself playing for their farm team, the Salt Lake Golden Eagles. Here he would have his best season to date, finishing with a 30–7–3 record in 40 games and leading the Eagles to the top of the CHL. He would even get called up for a single game with the Blues, but again watched as puck after puck got by in a 9–1 loss at the hands of the Minnesota North Stars.

In the summer of 1979, Richardson was involved in two trades. One from the Blues to the New York Islanders (along with Barry Gibbs) for future considerations on June 9 and from the Islanders to the Hartford Whalers for Ralph Klassen on June 14. He finished his career within the Whalers organization as he posted a 15–22–7 record in 46 games while playing again for the Springfield Indians in the 1979–80 season.

Career statistics

Regular season and playoffs

Awards
Named to International Hockey League All-Star Second Team (1976–77)
Won the James Norris Memorial Trophy (1976–77)
Named to Central Hockey League All-Star Second Team (1977–78, 1978–79)
Won the Terry Sawchuk Trophy (1978–79; shared with Doug Grant)

External links
 

1953 births
Living people
Canadian expatriate ice hockey players in England
Canadian expatriate ice hockey players in the United States
Canadian ice hockey goaltenders
Detroit Red Wings draft picks
Detroit Red Wings players
Ice hockey people from British Columbia
Kalamazoo Wings (1974–2000) players
Kansas City Red Wings players
London Lions (ice hockey) players
National Hockey League first-round draft picks
New Haven Nighthawks players
New Westminster Bruins players
People from Powell River, British Columbia
St. Louis Blues players
Salt Lake Golden Eagles (CHL) players
Sportspeople from New Westminster
Springfield Indians players
Virginia Wings players
Washington Capitals scouts